Swarnapureeswarar Temple is a Hindu temple located at Sembanarkoil near Mayiladuthurai on the road to Tharangambadi, Tamilnadu, India. The temple is dedicated to Shiva.

Deity 
The presiding deity is Swarnapureeswarar  and his consort is Suguntha Kundalambikai. The temple has been praised in hymns by the Saivite saints Sambandar and Thirunavukkarasar. According to Sambandhar, "No miseries would peep in to the life of those worshipping my Lord gracing from Semponpalli with Mother on His left and holding in His hand the Mazhu (axe) and His long hair glittering as golden thread." The temple is counted as one of the temples built on the banks of River Kaveri.

References 

 

Shiva temples in Mayiladuthurai district
Padal Petra Stalam
Maadakkoil